Arsi Oromo is an ethnic Oromo branch, inhabiting the Arsi, West Arsi and Bale Zones of the Oromia Region of Ethiopia, as well as in the Adami Tullu and Jido Kombolcha woreda of East Shewa Zone. They Arsi are made up of the Sikkoo-Mandoo branch
of Barento Oromo. The Arsi in all zones speaks Oromo share the same culture, traditions and identity with other subgroup Oromo.

Culture
The Arsi have developed a concept of Arsooma which roughly translates to Arsihood. This has provided Arsi with an identity that has been passing to clans and other groupings for a long period of time. The Arsi have a complex concept of clan division. The two main branches are Mandoo and Sikko. Mandoo refers to the Arsis in the Arsi and northern Bale Zones, while Sikko refers to those mainly in the Bale Zone.

History
Arsi Oromo state an intermarriage took place between their ancestors and previous inhabitants of the Arsi Province, Adere (Harari) whom they call the Hadiya. Hadiya clans claim their forefathers were Harari however they later became influenced by Sidama.

In the beginning of the early seventeenth century, the lands of Arsi Oromo were under the Emirate of Harar however the Emirate gradually lost control in the following centuries. In the eighteenth century, Emir Abd-Shakur made attempts to Islamisize the Arsi Oromo.

Arsi Oromo were largely independent and ruling under their own Gadaa Republic until about the 19th century. The Arsi Oromo demonstrated fierce resistance against the Abyssinian conquest of 1881-6, when Menelik II conducted several unsuccessful invasion campaigns against their territory. In response when the Abyssinians occupied Arsi, Shoans terrorized civilians by committing various atrocities including massacres and amputations. Although Arsi put up stiff opposition against an enemy equipped with modern European firearms, they were finally defeated in 1886. In the 1940s the Arsi Oromo with the people of Bale province joined the Harari Kulub movement an affiliate of the Somali Youth League that peacefully opposed Amhara Christian domination of Hararghe. The Ethiopian government brutally suppressed the ethno-religious movement using violence. During the 1970s the Arsi faced persecution by the Ethiopian government thus formed alliances with Somalia.

Notable people
Jawar Mohammed, Journalist and Activist
Kenenisa Bekele,   Athlete 
Tirunesh Dibaba,   Athlete
Derartu Tulu,      Athlete
Genzebe Dibaba,   Athlete

References 

Oromo groups